Barcelona Beach Festival is an electronic music festival held annually in Platja del Fòrum, Barcelona. It is organized by Live Nation and it is estimated that more than 70,000 people attend annually. It is one of the biggest music festivals in Spain. Recent performers include David Guetta, Armin van Buuren, DJ Snake and Dimitri Vegas & Like Mike.

Editions and artists

2014 

National DJs
 Fonsi Nieto
 Marsal Ventura
 Sergi Domene
 Alex de Guirior
 Quique Tejada
 Joan Reyes
 Oliver Schmit
 JP Candela
 Brian Cross
 Juan Magan
 The Zombie Kids

International DJs
 David Guetta
 Avicii
 Steve Angello

2015 

National DJs
 Marsal Ventura
 Sergi Domene
 Quique Tejada
 Brian Cross
 The Zombie Kids

International DJs
 David Guetta
Axwell /\ Ingrosso
 Hardwell
 Martin Garrix

2016

National DJs
 Jordi Véliz
 Sergi Domene
 Quique Tejada
 Brian Cross
 JP Candela

International DJs
 David Guetta
Axwell /\ Ingrosso
 Hardwell
 Martin Garrix
 Ruby Rose
 Sander Van Doorn
 Nicky Romero
 Alesso

2017

National DJs
 Jordi Véliz
 Marsal Ventura
 Dj Neil
 Brian Cross
 JP Candela
 Joswerk

International DJs
 Dimitri Vegas & Like Mike
 Kygo
Axwell /\ Ingrosso
 Hardwell
 Martin Garrix
 Armin van Buuren
 Lost Frequencies
 Kittens

2018

National DJs
 Xavi Alfaro
 Sergi Domene
 Jordi Vèliz
 Javi Reina
 Abel The Kid
 The Tripletz
 JP Candela
 Brian Cross

International DJs
 Robin Schulz
 Oliver Heldens
 Don Diablo
 David Guetta
 The Chainsmokers
 Axwell /\ Ingrosso
 Armin Van Buuren
 Tom Staar

2019

National DJs
 Brian Cross 
 DJ Nano
 JP Candela
 Dgrace
 DJ pelos
 Jerry Davila
 Uri Farre
 Xavi Alfaro
 Sergi Domene
 Jordi Vèliz

International DJs
Alesso
Armin Van Buuren
David Guetta
DJ Snake
Dimitri Vegas & Like Mike
Don Diablo
Steve Aoki
W&W

2020 (Cancelled by COVID-19 pandemic) 

National DJs
 Brian Cross 

International DJs
Marshmello
Timmy Trumpet
Armin Van Buuren
Alan Walker
Steve Aoki
Dimitri Vegas & Like Mike
W&W
Sunnery James & Ryan Marciano

2021 (Cancelled by COVID-19 pandemic)

2022 

National DJs
 Brian Cross 

International DJs
Marshmello
Morten
Timmy Trumpet
Armin Van Buuren
Vini Vici
Dimitri Vegas & Like Mike
Don Diablo
Sunnery James & Ryan Marciano
Chelina Manuhutu

2023 (Cancelled)

2024 (Expected)

Venue 

Platja del Fòrum is a beach located next to the port and the Port Fòrum marina, in the north of Barcelona. The sea views provide an incredible backdrop, with the city center within walking distance. Other festivals are held at the same location including Telecogresca and Hard Rock Rising.

References 

Music festivals in Spain